Devaswom Museum is a museum located at Guruvayur in Thrissur District showcasing rare offerings of devotees to the Guruvayur Temple. The museum exhibits temple materials, antiques, musical instruments, mural paintings, adornments used in folk arts like Krishnanattam and Kathakali, elephant teeth of Guruvayur Keshavan.

See also
Guruvayur Devaswom Institute of Mural Painting

References

Museums in Thrissur
Guruvayur